Šilainiai (from the Lithuanian words šilainė, šilainis 'sandy place, sandy soil' and šilas 'pinewood') could refer to several Lithuanian localities:
 
 Šilainiai, a Kaunas city part
 Šilainiai, Krakės, in Krakės Eldership of Kėdainiai District Municipality
 Šilainiai, Pelėdnagiai, in Pelėdnagiai Eldership of Kėdainiai District Municipality
 Šilainiai railway station in Zutkiai village of Kėdainiai District Municipality.

See also
Šilainėliai